The Kempholey night frog (Nyctibatrachus kempholeyensis) is a species of frog in the family Nyctibatrachidae.

Geographical range
It is endemic to the Western Ghats, India, where it is found between Karnataka and Kerala.

Habitat
Its natural habitats are tropical moist lowland forests and rivers.

Taxonomy
This species was discovered by C. R. Narayan Rao and was thought to have been extinct after remaining unsighted for 74 years. Its rediscovery coincided with the discovery of Nyctibatrachus poocha and others of the genus Nyctibatrachus by herpetologist Sathyabhama Das Biju.

References

External links

Nyctibatrachus
Frogs of India
Endemic fauna of the Western Ghats
Amphibians described in 1937
Taxonomy articles created by Polbot